The Bükkábrány Coal Mine is a coal mine located in Bükkábrány, Borsod-Abaúj-Zemplén County. The mine has coal reserves amounting to 400 million tonnes of lignite, one of the largest coal reserves in Europe and the world and has an annual production of 3.5 million tonnes of coal.

References 

Coal mines in Hungary
Energetický a průmyslový holding